The major town houses of Victor Horta are four town houses in Brussels, Belgium, which have been listed as a UNESCO World Heritage Site since 2000. All four houses were designed and built by the Belgian architect Victor Horta (1861–1947), who pioneered the Art Nouveau style during the mid-1890s.

History
Victor Horta was born in Ghent, Belgium, in 1861 and lived for several years in Paris before returning to Belgium to work as an architect in 1880. He achieved rapid success, working on several prestigious buildings and receiving a number of official posts including a position at the Free University of Brussels. From 1892, Horta began working in the new Art Nouveau style. In 1893, he designed the Hôtel Tassel, which is considered the first example of Art Nouveau architecture. He applied the same style to many subsequent buildings, including the Hôtel Solvay (built 1895–1900), Hôtel van Eetvelde (1895–1898) and his own house and workshop (1898). Among the architects who were inspired by Horta's works of the period are Antoni Gaudí and Hector Guimard.

During World War I, Horta went into exile in the United Kingdom and the United States. On returning to Belgium, Horta modified his styles in subsequent buildings, moving away from Art Nouveau towards Art Deco or Modernist styles to take account of changing popular tastes. He died in 1947.

List
Four houses are included in the UNESCO listing.

Among the notable surviving examples of Horta's Art Nouveau architecture in Belgium which are not included in the UNESCO listing are the Hôtel Max Hallet (1902) and the Magasins Waucquez (1908).

Recognition
The UNESCO commission recognised them in 2000:

The four houses were selected on the basis of their architectural importance but also because of their state of conservation.

See also

 Art Nouveau in Brussels
 History of Brussels
 Belgium in "the long nineteenth century"

References

Notes

External links

 Official listing page at UNESCO

Buildings and structures in Brussels
City of Brussels
World Heritage Sites in Belgium
Victor Horta buildings
Art Nouveau architecture in Brussels
Art Nouveau houses